Farewell and Chorley is a civil parish in the district of Lichfield, Staffordshire, England.  It contains 13 buildings that are recorded in the National Heritage List for England.  Of these, two are listed at Grade II*, the middle of the three grades, and the others are at Grade II, the lowest grade.  The parish contains the villages of Farewell and Chorley, and is otherwise rural.  Most of the listed buildings are houses, cottages, farmhouses and farm buildings.  The other listed buildings are a church, memorials in the churchyard, and a former corn mill.


Key

Buildings

References

Citations

Sources

Lists of listed buildings in Staffordshire